Canache may refer to:

In Greek mythology (Κανάχη):

Canache, same as Canace
Canache, one of Actaeon's dogs

Other uses:
The Canache, a bay in Stanley Harbour
Canache, a family name occurring in Spanish-speaking world